Alexander Stevenson may refer to:

 Alexander Stevenson (Scottish politician) (1860–1936), Scottish councillor and lay preacher
 Alexander Allan Stevenson (1829–1910), Canadian businessman, politician and military officer
 Alexander Campbell Stevenson (1802–1889), American farmer, physician, and politician
 Alexander Stevenson (footballer) (1903–?), Scottish football right back
 Alexander Stevenson (rugby union) (1885–1963), Scottish rugby union player
 Alex Stevenson (1912–1985), Irish footballer
 Alexander Stevenson (physician) (1726–1791), Scottish physician

See also
 Alexandra Stevenson (born 1980), American tennis player